The Public Health Service Hospital (PHSH) is a defunct hospital located in the Presidio of San Francisco, it was in operation (in this name) from 1912 to 1981. The precursor hospital was the San Francisco Marine Hospital, established in 1853, and renamed in 1912. The building for the Public Health Service Hospital was erected in 1931 or 1932, and in 2010 the building was converted into a residential apartment building.

History

San Francisco Marine Hospital 

In 1851, United States Congress established the hospital as the San Francisco Marine Hospital (also known as the U.S. Marine Hospital, San Francisco). The Marine Hospital Service was an organization of Marine Hospitals dedicated to the care of ill and disabled seamen in the United States Merchant Marine, the United States Coast Guard, and other federal beneficiaries. 

The building was completed in 1853, and had 500 beds at the time of opening. The first location was at Rincon Point in 1853; it was damaged by the 1868 Hayward earthquake and abandoned. 

A new building on the Presidio of San Francisco opened in 1875. A cemetery associated with the San Francisco Marine Hospital at the Presidio was actively used from approximately 1881 to 1912, and (as of 2006) the remains of the cemetery were still partially visible.

All of the Marine Hospital Service facilities nationwide evolved into part of the United States Public Health Service agency and the San Francisco Marine Hospital was renamed Public Health Service Hospital in 1912.

Public Health Service Hospital 

The current building opened in 1932. Two wings were added in the 1950s, which were later demolished in 2009.  In 1981, the Public Health Service Hospital shut down because of budget cuts.

Between 1982 and 1988, the buildings housed the San Francisco branch of the Defense Language Institute. It was closed in December 1988, and all remaining students were moved to Monterey, with plans to sell the hospital to the city of San Francisco. In the following years, the building remained empty, and became popular with squatters, graffiti artists and ghost hunters who were attracted by the allegedly haunted former morgue and operating rooms.

The historic 1932 modernist building was converted and rehabilitated for housing, and opened in 2010 as the Presidio Landmark apartments.

See also 
 Golden Gate National Recreation Area
 Letterman Army Hospital
 List of hospitals in California

References

External links 

 National Park Service: Public Health Service Hospital
 Loupiote.com: Photos of Public Health Service Hospital, before wings were demolished

Hospitals in San Francisco
Defunct hospitals in California
Golden Gate National Recreation Area
Apartment buildings in California
Residential buildings in San Francisco
Hospitals established in 1895
1895 establishments in California
Hospital buildings completed in 1932
1981 disestablishments in California
Modernist architecture in California
San Francisco
Cemeteries in San Francisco